Micropterix avarcella is a species of moth belonging to the family Micropterigidae which was described by Aleksei Konstantinovich Zagulajev in 1994. It is endemic to Russia.

References

Micropterigidae
Endemic fauna of Russia
Moths described in 1994
Moths of Asia
Moths of Europe
Taxa named by Aleksei Konstantinovich Zagulyaev